The Upper Peninsula League was a minor league baseball league that played in the 1890 and 1891 seasons. The six–team Independent level Upper Peninsula League consisted of franchises based exclusively in Michigan.

History
The Upper Peninsula League formed and began play in the 1890 season as a non–signatory, Independent level league. The Calumet Red Jackets, Hancock, Houghton, Ishpeming, Marquette Undertakers and Negaunee teams were the charter members.

In their first season of play, the league began the schedule on May 31, 1890. Houghton won the 1890 Upper Peninsula League championship with a 23–12 overall record in the six–team league, as the Hancock and Negaunee franchises folded during the season.

The Upper Peninsula League played with four teams in 1891. The Calumet Red Jackets won the championship with a 36–24 record. The Upper Peninsula League permanently folded following the 1891 season, evolving into the Wisconsin–Michigan League in 1892.

Upper Peninsula League teams

Upper Peninsula League overall standings 
1890 Upper Peninsula League standings
 Hancock and Negaunee disbanded mid–season
1891 Upper Peninsula League standings

References

External links
Baseball Reference

Defunct minor baseball leagues in the United States
Baseball leagues in Michigan
Defunct professional sports leagues in the United States
Sports leagues established in 1890
Sports leagues disestablished in 1891